This article summarizes equations used in optics, including geometric optics, physical optics, radiometry, diffraction, and interferometry.

Definitions

Geometric optics (luminal rays)

General fundamental quantities

Physical optics (EM luminal waves)

There are different forms of the Poynting vector, the most common are in terms of the E and B or E and H fields.

Radiometry

For spectral quantities two definitions are in use to refer to the same quantity, in terms of frequency or wavelength.

Equations

Luminal electromagnetic waves

Geometric optics

Subscripts 1 and 2 refer to initial and final optical media respectively.

These ratios are sometimes also used, following simply from other definitions of refractive index, wave phase velocity, and the luminal speed equation:

where:
ε = permittivity of medium,
μ = permeability of medium,
λ = wavelength of light in medium,
v = speed of light in media.

Polarization

Diffraction and interference

Astrophysics definitions

In astrophysics, L is used for luminosity (energy per unit time, equivalent to power) and F is used for energy flux (energy per unit time per unit area, equivalent to intensity in terms of area, not solid angle). They are not new quantities, simply different names.

See also

Defining equation (physics)
Defining equation (physical chemistry)
List of electromagnetism equations
List of equations in classical mechanics
List of equations in gravitation
List of equations in nuclear and particle physics
List of equations in quantum mechanics
List of equations in wave theory
List of relativistic equations

Sources

Further reading
 
 
 
 

Optics equations
Optics
Equations